In United States business law, a registered agent (also known as a resident agent, statutory agent, or agent for service of process) is a business or individual designated to receive service of process (SOP) when a business entity is a party in a legal action such as a lawsuit or summons. The registered agent's address may also be where the state sends the paperwork for the periodic renewal of the business entity's charter (if required). The registered agent for a business entity may be an officer or employee of the company, or a third party, such as the organization's lawyer or a service company. Failure to properly maintain a registered agent can affect a company negatively.

Services provided

Most businesses are not individuals but instead business entities such as corporations or limited liability companies (LLCs). This is because there are substantive (and substantial) liability protections as well as tax advantages to being "incorporated" as opposed to being "self-employed".

If a registered agent fails to perform their function, it can have dire consequences for the business entity. For example, if a customer fell inside a store and sued the store, and the store's registered agent failed to notify the business entity of a summons to appear in court to respond to the lawsuit, then when the case went to trial, nobody would appear to defend the store and the customer would win by a default judgment. Additionally, the store would likely not be able to get the judgment overturned on appeal because they had been properly served. This is one of the most common reasons that business entities generally will utilize a third party as their registered agent be it a commercial service company, an attorney, or in some cases, a CPA.

The person at a business entity that maintains contact with the registered agent is normally the corporate secretary or governance officer.

Designation

A registered agent is designated by a business entity by completing a form and filing it with the appropriate government agency, normally a state's Secretary of State's office.

Initial designation
In most all cases, the registered agent for a business entity is assigned in the formation documents filed in a jurisdiction when the entity is originally created. For example, a person forming a corporation in the State of Nevada or Delaware, would designate the registered agent along with the agent's address on the articles of incorporation filed with the Nevada Secretary of State or Delaware Secretary of State respectively. If the agent cannot sign the articles to be filed, some states such as Nevada provide that the registered agent may be designated using a separate "Registered Agent Acceptance" form with the appropriate acceptance and signature. A representative of the business or the individual accepting responsibility as registered agent must sign to accept the responsibility of acting as agent. In most states it is a crime to knowingly file a false document with the office of the Secretary of State, although the penalties vary widely. For example, in Nevada it is a Class "D" felony to forge this signature, but in Michigan it is only a misdemeanor.

Change of agent
A business entity might at some point want to change its previously designated registered agent to another party. This is accomplished by obtaining a form from the secretary of state where the business entity is registered, completing said form, and filing it with that state office along with any requisite fees which may vary from state to state. In some cases the required form may simply be a dedicated change of registered agent form, and in other cases, such as in Delaware, an actual amendment to the articles of the business entity must be filed.

Locating registered agents
Information about persons or entities that are available to act as registered agents in a given state may be maintained by the state's Secretary of State office. Most states also offer free online database searches to identify a business entity's registered agent.

Some state business entity laws name the Secretary of State's office or business entity filing office as the registered agent of last resort, in the event the named registered agent can't be found. By law, service may be made on the office if the entities registered agent can not be found. However, the plaintiff must demonstrate that it made a good faith effort to service the registered agent before it may serve the Secretary of State. The state laws vary in how to complete service on the Secretary of State and the amount of fees charged. Some of the states that may have this statutory provision are listed below. MoRAA eliminated this provision but some of the states that adopted MoRAA maintained this provision.

Regulation
Most jurisdictions in the United States require that any business entity that is formed or doing business within their borders designate and maintain a "registered agent". This person may be known as the "resident agent" or "statutory agent", depending on the laws of the individual jurisdiction in which the business entity is registered. The purpose of a registered agent is to provide a legal address (not a P.O. Box) within that jurisdiction where there are persons available during normal business hours to facilitate legal service of process being served in the event of a legal action or lawsuit. Generally, the registered agent is also the person to whom the state government sends all official documents required each year for tax and legal purposes, such as franchise tax notices and annual report forms. It is the registered agent's job to forward these suit documents and notices to the entity itself. Registered agents generally will also notify business entities if their state government filing status is in "good standing" or not. The reason that these notifications are a desired function of a registered agent is that it is difficult for a business entity to keep track of legislative changes and report due dates for multiple jurisdictions given the disparate laws of different states.

The failure to maintain a registered agent may cause a jurisdiction to revoke a business's corporate or LLC legal status, imposition of penalty fees on the entity, or both.

Who may serve as a registered agent
Different states have different requirements for registered agents. Typically, the agent must be a natural person resident of the state in question or, in states that allow entities to serve as registered agents, an entity having a business office within the state and authorized to do business in the state. In some states a business entity is legally allowed to act as its own registered agent, if at least one of its officers is a resident of the state, but other jurisdictions may require that a business entity designate a third party as its registered agent.
Because most states permit one business entity to serve as a registered agent for others, some businesses exist to serve that exact function, charging a fee to act as the registered agent for hundreds or thousands of businesses in a given state.

Model Registered Agents Act
The Model Registered Agents Act (MoRAA) is an effort spearheaded by the American Bar Association Business Law Section and the International Association of Commercial Administrators (IACA) – Business Organization Section (BOS) to standardize business entity laws as they relate to annual reports, registered agents and other laws and forms used to file business entities. The act also creates two distinct classes of registered agent: "commercial" and "non-commercial." The National Conference of Commissions on Uniform State Laws (NCCUSL) organized a drafting committee composed of commissions, ABA, and IACA representatives who drafted the act's language. NCCUSL adopted MoRAA at its 2006 annual meeting. It was amended in 2011. Eleven US jurisdictions (Arkansas, District of Columbia, Idaho, Maine, Mississippi, Montana, Nevada, North Dakota, South Dakota, Utah, and Wyoming) have since adopted the model act, and Delaware did not adopt the act, but did adopt the "commercial registered agent" provision.  The problem this effort seeks to alleviate is that disparate laws, filing requirements, and forms in all of the US jurisdictions where business entities are filed creates a quagmire for any company seeking to register to do business in those jurisdictions. By adopting a common set of laws, the Model Registered Agents Act seeks to create a uniform and simple process of filing and maintaining a business entity in any jurisdiction adopting it.

 Alaska
 Arkansas
 California
 Delaware
 Idaho
 Maine
 Mississippi
 Montana
 Nevada
 New Hampshire
 North Dakota
 Pennsylvania
 Wyoming

See also
 List of Secretaries of State, who in the United States provide information about available registered agents in each state

References

Agency law
United States business law
Region-specific legal occupations